March is a crater on Mercury. It has a diameter of 70 kilometers. Its name was adopted by the International Astronomical Union in 1979. March is named for the Valencian poet in Catalan language Ausias March, who lived from 1397 to 1459.

At the time of the Mariner 10 mission in 1974 and 1975, March and the three craters surrounding it were informally called the Teddy Bear.

References

Impact craters on Mercury